Toomulla is a coastal town and suburb in the City of Townsville, Queensland, Australia.

Geography 

History 

Amenities 
Toomulla is a popular fishing and birdwatching destination, and its facilities include a boat ramp and designated camping areas.

References 

Suburbs of Townsville